Duncan James Jessiman,  (June 5, 1923 – April 19, 2006) was a Canadian lawyer and Senator.

Born in Winnipeg, Manitoba, he received a Bachelor of Arts, a Bachelor of Law, and a Master of Law all from the University of Manitoba. During World War II, he served with the Royal Canadian Navy and was discharged with the rank of Lieutenant in 1945. From 1948 to 1971, he practiced law with the firm of Johnston, Jessiman & Gardner. In 1971, he became a senior partner of the law firm Pitblado & Hoskin. From 1956 to 1967, he was a lecturer in corporation law at the University of Manitoba. He was appointed Queen's Counsel in 1959. He was a member of the board of the University of Winnipeg for 16 years.

In 1993, he was appointed to the Senate by Brian Mulroney and represented the senatorial division of  Manitoba. He sat as a Progressive Conservative and retired on his 75th birthday in 1998.

He was married to Alix and had three children Duncan, Robert and Sally.

External links
 

1923 births
2006 deaths
Lawyers in Manitoba
Canadian senators from Manitoba
Politicians from Winnipeg
Progressive Conservative Party of Canada senators
University of Manitoba alumni
Canadian King's Counsel
Robson Hall alumni